Alfred Kain (14 December 1927 – 7 February 2010) was an Austrian racing cyclist. He rode in the 1954 Tour de France.

References

1927 births
2010 deaths
Austrian male cyclists
Place of birth missing